Antoni Vadell i Ferrer (17 May 1972 – 12 February 2022) was a Spanish Roman Catholic prelate.

He was born in Llucmajor in the Balearic Islands, Spain. He became a priest in 1998. In 2017, he became the Auxiliary Bishop of Barcelona.

Vadell Ferrer died from pancreatic cancer in Barcelona on 12 February 2022, at the age of 49.

References

1972 births
2022 deaths
People from Mallorca
Deaths from cancer in Spain
Deaths from pancreatic cancer
21st-century Roman Catholic bishops in Spain
Clergy from Barcelona